Ruchika Shaurya Prakash is an American psychologist who is a professor at Ohio State University. She is Director of the Center for Cognitive and Behavioral Brain Imaging. Prakash was awarded the American Psychological Association Early Career Achievement Award in 2016. She delivered online webinars on resilience and mindfulness throughout the COVID-19 pandemic.

Early life and education 
Prakash was born in India and attended Delhi University, where her parents were both lecturers. Prakash completed a bachelor's and master's degree in psychology. She moved to the United States to gain training in neuroscience, and joined the University of Illinois Urbana-Champaign. Her doctoral research made use of functional magnetic resonance imaging to better understand multiple sclerosis. In particular, Prakash considered relapsing remitting MS, which she showed causes considerable cognitive impairments in memory and learning. She showed that high levels of aerobic fitness can preserve grey matter and fractional anisotropy in white matter tracts. Alongside her doctoral research, Prakash showed that physical fitness was related to brain development in children.

Research and career 
Prakash continued to study neuroplasticity and neurological disorders. She is interested in understanding the similarities and differences between cognitive dysfunction in ageing and multiple sclerosis. Prakash has developed strategies that can help to reduce cognitive decline, including fitness and wellbeing-based interventions.

Prakash demonstrated that mindfulness training and meditation can help people with multiple sclerosis process negative emotions and improve their processing speed. During the COVID-19 pandemic, Prakash delivered an online webinar on mindfulness and meditation.

Awards and honors 
 2013 Association for Psychological Science Rising Star
 2016 American Psychological Association Springer Early Career Achievement in Research on Adult Development and Aging Award

Selected publications

References 

Living people
21st-century American psychologists
American women psychologists
University of Illinois Urbana-Champaign alumni
Delhi University alumni
Ohio State University faculty
Indian emigrants to the United States
Year of birth missing (living people)